P. incana  may refer to:
 Pineda incana, a flowering plant species native to the Andes of Ecuador and Peru
 Potentilla incana, a synonym for Potentilla arenaria, a plant species

See also
 Incana (disambiguation)